The 2015 Supercupa României was the 17th edition of Romania's season opener cup competition. The game was contested between Liga I title holders, Steaua București, and 2nd place holders, ASA Târgu Mureș. It was played at Stadionul Farul in Constanța in July. Târgu Mureș won the trophy for the first time in history, after defeating Steaua, 1–0.

Match

Details

References

External links
Romania - List of Super Cup Finals, RSSSF.com

2015–16 in Romanian football
Supercupa României
FC Steaua București matches